Pseudovanilla foliata, commonly known as the great climbing orchid, is a plant in the orchid family native to Queensland, New South Wales, and New Guinea. It is a terrestrial orchid with a vining vegetative habit, climbing by means of adventitious roots produced at nodes. Its leaves are reduced, and the species is considered to be at least partially mycoheterotrophic.

Description
Pseudovanilla foliata is a terrestrial, perennial, entirely glabrous vine. Adventitious roots (roots that arise from the stem), which are thinly elongated and flexuose, extend from the nodes and are always accompanied by an opposite bract, a useful distinguishing feature.

P. foliata bears a lax but highly branching inflorescence with 4 to 8 flowers at the apex of each offshoot. The rachis is slightly swollen, and the floral bracts are minute and triangular. The flowers have yellow sepals and petals, as well as a ruffled white labellum with orange to pink markings. Near its apex (tip), the lip is vaguely 3-lobed with undulate margins; the lateral lobes are bluntly rounded, and the mid-lobe is shaped like a semicircle, indistinctly notched. The surface of the lip is covered with irregular protuberances and in the basal half with rather long obtuse warts. The callus is keeled and extends from the base of the lip to the middle.  

The anther is square-hooded and in front slightly notched. P. foliata flowers from October to January.

Taxonomy and naming
The great climbing orchid was first formally described in 1861 by Ferdinand von Mueller, who gave it the name Ledgeria foliata and published the description in Fragmenta Phytographiae Australiae. Mueller then renamed it to Galeola foliata in 1873. In 1986, Leslie Andrew Garay published it under its currently accepted name, Pseudovanilla foliata.

Distribution and habitat
Pseudovanilla foliata is found in Queensland as far north as Cape York Peninsula, as well as in the northeast and central east. Its southernmost distribution reaches coastal central New South Wales, and populations also exist in New Guinea.

Conservation
Pseudovanilla foliata is classified as "least concern" by the Queensland Government in the ''Nature Conservation Act 1992.

References

foliata
Plants described in 1861
Orchids of New Guinea
Orchids of Australia